Louise Marguerite Renaude Lapointe,  (January 3, 1912 – May 11, 2002) was a Canadian journalist and a Senator. She was among the first Canadian women to work as a professional journalist and the first French-Canadian woman to preside over the Senate.

Born in Disraeli, Quebec the daughter of Joseph-Alphonse Lapointe and Marie-Louise Poulin, she worked as a journalist in the 1940s and 1950s at Le Soleil in Quebec City. In 1959 she joined the staff of Montreal's La Presse.

A member of the Liberal Party of Canada, she was appointed to the Senate in 1971 by Pierre Trudeau and served until her retirement in 1987. From September 12, 1974 until October 4, 1979, she was Speaker of the Senate. She was also Speaker pro tempore from June 9, 1982 until November 30, 1983.

In 1989 she was invested as a Companion of the Order of Canada.

External links

Order of Canada Citation

1912 births
2002 deaths
Canadian senators from Quebec
Speakers of the Senate of Canada
Companions of the Order of Canada
Journalists from Quebec
People from Chaudière-Appalaches
Liberal Party of Canada senators
Members of the King's Privy Council for Canada